Rocket Boys is an Indian Hindi-language biographical streaming television series on SonyLIV. The Series is based on the lives of Homi J. Bhabha and Vikram Sarabhai. It is directed by Abhay Pannu and produced by Siddharth Roy Kapur with Monisha Advani, and Madhu Bhojwani
under the banners Roy Kapur Films and Emmay Entertainment, respectively. The series stars Jim Sarbh and Ishwak Singh along with Regina Cassandra.

The web series was released on 4 February 2022 exclusively on SonyLIV.

Rocket Boys Season 2  was released on 16th March 2023, exclusively on Sony LIV. The first look for the second season was unveiled on 15 August 2022, on the 75th Indian Independence Day, while the second teaser was released on 12 February 2023. The second teaser focuses on how imperative it was for India to become a nuclear nation amidst imminent global threats of war resulting in India's first nuclear test also known as Pokhran I in 1974. The series will cover the incredible journey of India's greatest scientists as they shape a new era where no one dared to challenge their country's sovereignty.

Synopsis

Rocket Boys is a story of two extraordinary men Dr. Homi J. Bhabha and Dr. Vikram Sarabhai. The story is set around the three crucial decades (1940-60s) in the history of India and how the nation is moving towards being a strong, brave, and independent nation. It is the story of Independent India's formative years in the field of science.

With dreams in their eyes and a vision in their minds, Dr. Homi J. Bhabha engineered India's Nuclear Programme and Dr. Vikram Sarabhai established the Indian Space Programme and many other institutes. Their journey also involves Mrinalini Sarabhai, a strong pillar in Dr. Sarabhai's life, Dr. A. P. J. Abdul Kalam, who pioneered modern Indian aerospace and nuclear technology, Parvana Irani a close companion of Dr. Bhabha, Raza Mehdi (Not a real person but a fictional character scripted as antagonist for dramatization), a distinguished scientist, and Pandit Jawaharlal Nehru who supported them at every step.

The season builds upon their friendship, sacrifice, and great determination and how everything led to India's first rocket launch; its emblematic of the journey of India as the country emerges into a new, post-war world.

Cast
 Jim Sarbh as Dr. Homi J. Bhabha
 Ishwak Singh as Dr. Vikram Sarabhai
 Regina Cassandra as Mrinalini Sarabhai
 Saba Azad as Parwana Irani a.k.a. Pipsy
 Rajit Kapur as Jawaharlal Nehru
 T.M. Karthik as C. V. Raman
 Dibyendu Bhattacharya as Raza Mehdi
 Namit Das as Prosenjit Dey
 Arjun Radhakrishnan as Dr. A.P.J. Abdul Kalam
 K.C. Shankar as Vishwesh Mathur
 Neha Chauhan as Kamla Chowdhry
 Rajeev Kachroo as JRD Tata
 Darious Shroff as Jehangir Bhabha
 Anahita Uberoi as Mehreen Bhabha
 Mark Bennington as Robert Crowley
 Arjun Dwivedi as Lt Col Sabharwal
 Ed Robinson as Agent Miller
 Benedict Garrett as William Colby
 Charu Shanker as Indira Gandhi
 Rahul Dev Shetty as Raja Ramanna
 Nilanjan Datta as Pranab Rebatiranjan Dastidar

Production 
The Hari Mahal Palace in Jaipur was used as a location of the "Retreat", the Sarabhai family house. The art team met Mallika Sarabhai, daughter of Sarabhai, for detailed information about their home, culture, environment and lifestyle.

Episodes

Season 1

Season 2

Reception
The show received positive reviews from critics and audience, with praise for the performances, direction, writing and other technical aspects.

The Times of India gave a rating of 3.5 and stated that Jim Sarbh and Ishwak Singh's show is a glowing tribute to India's scientific luminaries. Further, they also said that the show is captivating from the start. Anuj Kumar of The Hindu mentioned that the lead actors Jim Sarbh and Ishwak Singh head a fantastic ensemble cast that gloriously brings to life the achievements of the scientific community in launching India's atomic and space programs. Shefali Deshpande of The Quint gave 4.5/5 stars and said that Rocket Boys is the kind of story that the Oscars and the people at BAFTA look for. In addition to this they also stated that the top-notch acting, storytelling, direction, and music, with actual footage from back in the day and audio to go along with it, this show is here to win slow, steady, and big. Moneycontrol said in their article that Roy Kapur Films, Emmay Entertainment, and SonyLIV together put up a brilliant show that is unmissable. Shubhra Gupta of The Indian Express mentioned Rocket Boys is an absorbing state-of-the-nation saga and both Jim Sarbh and Ishwak Singh are excellent. Hindustan Times expressed Rocket Boys as one of the web series with the most well-crafted, earnestly performed, and tightly-written scenes. Moreover, it also said that the show is a shining star on the streamer's roster. The Scroll.in wrote that Rocket Boys is fuelled by vaulting ambition on the screen and beyond, and it's a heady mix of research and creative liberty, pop quiz-level trivia, and a flair for drama. NDTV Gadgets 360 said that Abhay Pannu's Rocket Boys delivers in spades with the story of Homi Bhabha and Vikram Sarabhai and mentioned India comes of age in SonyLIV's terrific new series. NDTV gave a 3.5 rating to Rocket Boys and further said that The series gets the science of blending fact and fiction absolutely right and delivers a viewing experience that is a marked remove from generic shows. ThePrint featured Rocket Boys as a unique blend of science and the everyday, personal and political, fact and fiction, that makes science less elite, more accessible, more awe-inspiring while being grounded. Priya Hazra of ScoopWhoop said praised the show by saying that it is an on-point casting & brilliant storytelling that makes 'Rocket Boys' a biopic Bollywood could learn from. It further added that witnessing the historic event unfold, even on the screen, was an overwhelming and proud moment, and given the earnestness with which it was played out made it even better. Pinkvilla gave 4/5 stars and stated that Jim Sarbh and Ishwak Singh fabulously bolster India's empirical history. It also mentioned that Rocket Boys treads a measured pace and gradually develops a story and its characters to make the bigger picture more interesting and entertaining. While the writing, casting, and acting are on point, the show also scores big on its background music and production music. Outlook gave a rating of 4 and said that Jim Sarbh, Ishwak Singh shines in this humanized tale of India's greatest scientists and makes it a wonderful biopic drama that never stops inspiring. Arré's thoughts on Rocket Boys were that the series did a good job of visualizing and explaining technical details to a layperson in a cinematic way. In addition to this, it also said that "Rocket Boys" is an important watch to reflect on the dreams of India's OG scientific pioneers and hopefully inspire young minds. Rediff gave a rating of 4 and stated that Rocket Boys is a soaring tribute to the two pillars of India's science world. Shekhar Gupta of The Print criticized in his article titled 'Rocket Boys’ crime on history: Inventing Muslim villain, stealing Meghnad Saha's identity''' saying "That he [Meghnad Saha] was from a lower caste, and has mostly been forgotten in our popular memory since (on his centenary in 1993, the Narasimha Rao government issued a postage stamp), probably made it more convenient to bury his character in what pretends to be a “true” history and give him a mostly evil, dark, Muslim avatar. In our book, this is a crime on not just history but on all the ideals so dear to people like Saha, Bhabha and Sarabhai. Remember, those incredible scientists were freedom fighters too."

Amrita Shah, author of Vikram Sarabhai – A Life'' criticised the series for distorting history with fictionalized events, puerile depiction of India's technological programmes in space and nuclear energy and egregious misrepresentation of Sarabhai's character that diminishes his significance and lacks depth without any nuance. Journalist Gita Aravamudan (wife of Ramabhadran Aravamudan and co-author of ISRO: A Personal History) found the series reducing iconic Indian scientists into Bollywood stereotypes, falsifying major events and dates and concocting a fake version of A. P. J. Abdul Kalam that suits the script. She adds that real story of Indian nuclear and space programs is far more richer than fictionalized screen version which ignores scientific and technical aspects of their journey.

Awards and nominations

References

External links
 
 Rocket Boys on SonyLiv

2022 Indian television series debuts
Indian drama television series
Hindi-language television shows
SonyLIV original films